Manogea is a genus of Central and South American orb-weaver spiders first described by Herbert Walter Levi in 1997.  it contains only three species.

References

Araneidae
Araneomorphae genera
Spiders of Central America
Spiders of Mexico
Spiders of South America